Wira Wama (born 24 October 1989) is a Papua New Guinean footballer who plays as a midfielder for Hekari United in the Papua New Guinea National Soccer League.  Besides Papua New Guinea, he has played in the United States.

References

1989 births
Living people
Papua New Guinean footballers
Association football midfielders
Papua New Guinea international footballers
Hekari United players
2012 OFC Nations Cup players
2016 OFC Nations Cup players